The Hong Kong College of Physicians is a professional body for physicians in Hong Kong.

References 

Medical associations in Hong Kong
Organizations with year of establishment missing